Thomas Joseph Dowse (August 12, 1866 – December 14, 1946) was a catcher/outfielder who played in Major League Baseball from  through . Listed at 5' 11", 175 lb, Dowse batted and threw right-handed. He was born in Mohill, Ireland.

In a three-season career, Dowse was a .197 hitter (116-for-590) with 46 RBI without home runs in 160 games played.

Basically a catcher, Dowse also played every position but third baseman and shortstop during his major-league tenure. He started his career in 1890 with the Cleveland Spiders of the National League, appearing in 40 games for them while hitting a .208 average. That season, he also served as an emergency umpire in three games. In 1891 he played for the Columbus Solons of the American Association and posted career-numbers in average (.224), RBI (22), runs (24), and doubles (7). Dowse returned to the National League in 1892 with the Louisville Colonels, appearing in 41 games for them before moving to the Cincinnati Reds (one), Philadelphia Phillies (16) and Washington Senators (7), hitting .165 in a career-high 65 games. He never appeared in a major league game again.

Dowse died in Riverside, California, at the age of 80.

See also
List of players from Ireland in Major League Baseball

External links

Retrosheet

Cincinnati Reds players
Cleveland Spiders players
Columbus Solons players
Louisville Colonels players
Philadelphia Phillies players
Washington Senators (1891–1899) players
Major League Baseball catchers
Major League Baseball outfielders
19th-century baseball players
Major League Baseball players from Ireland
Irish baseball players
Sportspeople from County Leitrim
1866 births
1946 deaths
Hartford Dark Blues (minor league) players
Wilkes-Barre Barons (baseball) players
Atlanta (minor league baseball) players
Buffalo Bisons (minor league) players
Wilkes-Barre Coal Barons players
Binghamton Bingoes players
Allentown Buffaloes players
Troy Washerwomen players
Scranton Indians players
Toronto Canadians players
Albany Senators players
Rochester Blackbirds players
Syracuse Stars (minor league baseball) players
Irish emigrants to the United States (before 1923)